Conta pectinata is a species of South Asian river catfish endemic to India where it occurs the Brahmaputra River drainage of Assam.  This species grows to a length of  SL.

References 
 

Erethistidae
Catfish of Asia
Fish of India
Taxa named by Heok Hee Ng
Fish described in 2005